Bianca Claßen (born 6 February 1993, née Heinicke), better known by her YouTube channel name BibisBeautyPalace, is a German fashion and beauty YouTuber. As of May 2022 she has almost 5.9 million subscribers on YouTube.

Career

2012 and 2013: Beginning 
Claßen began making her videos in December 2012, gaining her first 500 subscribers within less than two months. Her videos focus on hair, makeup, fashion, travel, lifestyle and challenges.

She recorded her earliest YouTube videos using a Panasonic HC-V500 video camera.

2014: Advancements 

In 2014, she won an award in the Beauty, Fashion, and Lifestyle category at the Google Play Awards. As of 2017, she had the fourth most popular YouTube channel in Germany.

2015 and 2016 
In May 2015, she launched her own cosmetics brand called Bilou, meant as an acronym for "Bibi loves you".

Over time, the variety of her cosmetics products, namely the flavours of her shampoos, has increased.

Heinicke appeared in the mid-2015 film "Kartoffelsalat – Nicht fragen!", ensemble cast with other major German YouTube personalities.

In October 2015, in cooperation with the German Telekom and Sony Mobile, a customized variant of the Sony Xperia M4 Aqua mobile phone was released in Germany, known as the Bibi-Phone edition. It differentiates from the original with a picture of Bianca's face and her signature printed on the unit's rear cover, and additional wallpaper pictures and ring tones.

In March 2016, her channel surpassed three million subscribers.

Bianca Claßen among her spouse Julian Claßen appeared in YouTube Rewind 2015 and 2016.

2017 
As the year commenced, her channel surpassing Erik Range's channel Gronkh and claiming the spot as the most-subscribed German-language YouTube channel approached within an increasingly foreseeable time. A campaign attempting to sustain the latter's spot gained traction on social media under the hash tag #AbonniertGronkhDeabonniertBibi ("subscribe to Gronkh, unsubscribe from Bibi"), slightly delaying the surpassion.

In May 2017, Bianca Claßen released her first song under the nickname Bibi H., titled "How It Is (Wap Bap …)". Within several days of its release, the song's video became the eleventh most disliked video on YouTube, and most disliked video on any German YouTube channel, surpassing the multiple formerly most downvoted videos by "ApoRed" within hours.

In November 2017, on the second operational day of her iPhone X smartphone, she noticed a defective pixel on its display panel. She attempted to create a screen capture of that hardware defect, sharing it on Twitter. The incident went viral with responses educating her how a software-based screen capture is unable to capture hardware-based panel defects.

2019 
In January 2019, the couple reacted to videos of low view counts, including a reupload of a lost 2015 telephony commercial involving her, posted hours prior to the recording, and a man parodizing their pregnancy photos.

2020 
In March 2020, the couple discussed their struggle of finding a hospital to birth their daughter under the COVID-19 pandemic.

2021 
In January 2021, the couple found a molded mobile phone case in a wardrobe, and jokingly decided to sell it on eBay as an artistic obstacle. The auction went viral due to her promotion of it on her Instagram Stories channel, clocking in €133.000 as the highest bid. The auction was cancelled, however.

Television appearances 

Personal life 
Heinicke grew up in Cologne, North Rhine-Westphalia, Germany. After receiving her Abitur, she went to college to study social sciences, but later left in order to focus on making YouTube videos.

Julian Claßen 
She is married to the German YouTuber Julian Claßen, nicknamed "Julienco".

After a nine-year relationship starting on 1 March 2009, they married on 12 September 2018.

Their relationship is often dubbed using the community-created portmanteau "Julianca", a mixture of both their first names.

On 12 May 2018, she announced her pregnancy through a cinematic, professionally produced three-minute film that has amassed 7.67 Million views as of 11 October 2019 and was teased twice days in advance.

She gave birth to her son on 4 October 2018, named Lio. She later announced that she was pregnant with their second child, a girl. On 20 March 2020 she gave birth to her daughter Emily.

In 2022 the couple announced their breakup.

References 

1993 births
German YouTubers
Beauty and makeup YouTubers
Living people
Businesspeople from Cologne
Lifestyle YouTubers
21st-century German businesswomen
21st-century German businesspeople